Lennart Andersson (born 20 August 1957) is a Swedish sports shooter. He competed in two events at the 1996 Summer Olympics.

References

External links
 

1957 births
Living people
Swedish male sport shooters
Olympic shooters of Sweden
Shooters at the 1996 Summer Olympics
People from Strömsund Municipality
Sportspeople from Jämtland County